C. bicolor  may refer to:
 Caladium bicolor, a plant species
 Cataglyphis bicolor, the Sahara Desert ant, a desert-dwelling ant species found in the Sahara Desert
 Centruroides bicolor, a bark scorpion species found in Central America
 Coendou bicolor, the bicolored-spined porcupine, a rodent species found in Bolivia, Colombia, Ecuador and Peru
 Cucujus bicolor, a species of bark beetle in genus Cucujus

See also
 Bi-color (disambiguation)